Uganda is one of the largest refugee-hosting nations in the world, with 1,529,904  refugees (as of 28 February 2022). The vast influx of refugees is due to several factors in Uganda's neighboring countries, especially war and violence in South Sudan and the Democratic Republic of the Congo), and associated economic crisis and political instability in the region. Uganda has relatively 'friendly' policies that provide rights to the refugees, such as rights to education, work, private property, healthcare and other basic social services.

Demographics 
Most of the refugees in Uganda come from neighboring countries, especially South Sudan and the Democratic Republic of the Congo.

Refugee Camps 

Uganda currently has 11 settlement camps:
 Achol-Pii Settlement
 Bidi Bidi Settlement
 Imvepi Refugee Settlement
 Kampala Settlement
 Kiryandongo Settlement
 Kyaka II Settlement
 Kyangwali Settlement
 Nakivale Settlement
 Palorinya Settlement
 Rhino Settlement
 Rwamwanja Settlement

Almost 50% of refugees in Uganda are located in the Bidi Bidi, Pagirinya, and Rhino refugee settlement camps, located in the northwest region of the country. Additionally, South Sudan accounts for 62% of refugees in Uganda, while the Democratic Republic of the Congo accounts for 29%.

Refugees from the Democratic Republic of the Congo 
As of the end of 2019, there are over 900,000 Congolese refugees being hosted in various African countries, with over 40% currently in Uganda. The region of the DR Congo bordering Uganda is the place of origin for the vast majority of Congolese refugees. The massive influx of refugees is largely caused by the persistent violence and fighting that has dominated the DR Congo. Many refugees enter Uganda through Lake Albert in the Ituri province of the DR Congo, which borders the northwest region of Uganda. Of the 900,000 refugees, almost 3% are children traveling alone; almost 2% are women at risk; and 0.2% are fleeing sexual- or gender-based violence.

The presence of refugees in Uganda has had a positive influence on the rates of consumption and access to private education in the communities that host them. This is due to increased channels of commerce in areas where more refugees are present, and the policies enforced by non-governmental organizations that allow for private education providers to be more common in areas with higher refugee populations.

Reasons for Fleeing

The Kivu Conflict 
The conflict in the Kivu region of the DR Congo has persisted since before the First Congo War, and currently takes form as a conflict between ethnic groups with political actors having a major influence. Armed groups from the Congolese Babembe, Bafuliru, and Banyindu communities are fighting with the Rwandan Banyamulenge, as Rwanda borders the Kivu region. Many suggest that the conflict concerns control over land and resources, as Kivu is plentiful in minerals.

This conflict has resulted in the displacement of over 200,000 people and the destruction of many communities. Further, crucial facilities have been destroyed, including schools, hospitals, and clinics. As of August 2019, almost 2,000 civilians have been killed in this conflict.

Violence in Ituri 
The conflict in the Ituri province of the DR Congo is a result of fighting between the Hema and Lendu ethnic groups. This violence has persisted for years, though it recently worsened as the availability of weapons in the area increased. Since September 2018, the Lendus have carried out an increasing amount of violent attacks against the Hemas, with crimes ranging from killings, rapings, and destruction of crucial facilities.

During the summer of 2019, President Felix Tshisekedi of the DR Congo condemned the inter-ethnic group violence as attempted genocide. In January 2020, the United Nations released a report declaring the ethnic violence in the Ituri province to be crimes against humanity. Hundreds of Congolese seeking safety and stability cross into Uganda every day as a result of this conflict.

More than 700 people have been killed in this conflict, and hundreds are victims of sexual violence. The majority of these victims are from the Hema communities.

The Ebola Outbreak 
Since 1976, there have been 10 outbreaks of Ebola in the DR Congo, with the most recent one beginning in August 2018 and continuing into the present. The current outbreak mostly effects the Ituri and North Kivu provinces, and the number of cases has officially surpassed 3,000. In July 2019, this outbreak was declared a public health emergency of international concern by a representative of the World Health Organization.

The outbreak has slowed in 2020, with the last recorded case being confirmed on February 17. This is the largest Ebola outbreak in the DR Congo, and is the second greatest Ebola outbreak recorded worldwide.

Reasons for Coming to Uganda 
Uganda currently hosts the greatest amount of refugees out of all the African countries, which may be due to their open-door refugee policy. In fact, the country's government has made welcoming and caring for refugees an important part of its national policy. Uganda's approach to refugees involves welcoming relatively anyone seeking refuge or asylum in the country, regardless of country of origin. They also allow refugees the freedom of movement and the right to pursue employment. Furthermore, refugee families are each given a piece of land so that they may benefit from agriculture.

Uganda has supported the Democratic Republic of the Congo since the government intervened in the war torn country in 1998.

Problems faced by Refugees 

Last year, Uganda took in more refugees than any other country in the world. One of the major problems faced by the refugees is that most of these stranded people are children. Some of the challenges faced by refugees include agricultural productivity, information dissemination and distribution of goods.

COVID-19 and Refugees 
The novel strain of coronavirus, named COVID-19, first appeared in Wuhan, China, with the earliest case reported on November 17, 2019. By January 13, 2020, the virus had spread from China to Thailand, marking the first case of COVID-19 outside of China. On March 11, 2020, the World Health Organization officially recognized the outbreak of COVID-19 as a pandemic. By this time, the virus had spread to more than 114 countries and had taken the lives of over 4,000 people. As of April 17, 2020, there are almost 2.2 million confirmed cases of COVID-19 worldwide, 55 confirmed cases in Uganda, 4 confirmed cases in South Sudan, and 287 confirmed cases in the Democratic Republic of the Congo. As healthcare professionals and researchers continue to learn more about the virus, various groups have come to public attention as high risk groups. One such group is refugees.

Refugees and otherwise displaced populations are particularly vulnerable because of the conditions in which they live. For example, many refugees live in camps or settlements with incredibly high population density and limited access to basic services. Refugees in camps and settlements also encounter difficulties in accessing reliable and accurate information due to a variety of barriers. Further, refugees around the world heavily rely upon the aid of humanitarian groups, non-governmental organizations, and governments; due to the pandemic, these groups will be focusing their efforts and finances on the virus.

In late March 2020, the Ugandan government announced that it would formally suspend the acceptance of refugees and asylum seekers into the country as the number of confirmed cases increased. Many fear the death toll from COVID-19 in Uganda will increase exponentially should the virus be introduced to the many refugee settlements. In addition, representatives of the United Nations Refugee Agency worry that the conditions of refugee settlements may enable the spread of the virus, as access to water is limited, and current food rations have been cut. Ugandan authorities have recently found it difficult to ensure that refugees are complying with the health and safety guidelines implemented by the government in order to limit the spread of the coronavirus. Musu Ecweru, Uganda's State Minister for Disaster Preparedness, explains that this lack of compliance may be due to the fact that many refugees come from countries where the governments are not trusted; as such, submitting to authority is unusual and difficult.

Problems caused by refugees 
Uganda, for all its hospitality, has struggled to handle the large inflow of refugees. These refugees come to the country needing medical care as many are sick or injured from their journey. This has placed a  lot of pressure on health officials in the country. In Uganda, there is approximately one doctor to every 24,000 citizens, and one nurse per every 11,000. This has presented challenges in caring for refugees. Initially, refugees used to be given some land to farm and take care of their families but because of the huge increase in the number of refugees, the country can not do it anymore making to difficult for refugees to feed themselves. The presence of these refugees has not only made it because to provide land but water and shelter as well. In part, the struggle for food by refugees has resulted from officials working these camps misusing the funds meant for the refugees to enrich themselves instead.  This has led to the investigation of some of these officials.

See also
 South Sudanese Civil War
 Kivu Conflict

References 

Immigration to Africa
Refugees in Africa
Refugees of South Sudan
Immigration to Uganda